Sultan Sir Badlishah ibni Almarhum Sultan Abdul Hamid Halim Shah  (17 March 1894 – 13 July 1958) was the 27th Sultan of Kedah, a present Malaysian state, between 1943 and 1958. He succeeded the throne upon the death of his father, Sultan Abdul Hamid Halim Shah. He was the elder half brother of the first Prime Minister of Malaysia, Tunku Abdul Rahman.

Sultan Badlishah also served as regent of Kedah between 1937 and 1943. In 1943, he was deposed by the Imperial Japanese Army, but was reinstated following their surrender and the end of the Japanese occupation of Malaya in 1945.

Family
Sultan Badlishah was married twice. His first marriage was to Tunku Sofiah binti Almarhum Tunku Mahmud (born 1899) in 1922. The marriage produced an heir, who was the fifth and fourteenth King of Malaysia and the Sultan of Kedah, Sultan Abdul Halim Mu'adzam Shah. Tunku Sofia died in 1934 caused by an automobile accident.
 Tunku Abdul Hamid (born 20 August 1923, died young)
 Tunku Hamidah (22 September 1925 - 4 November 2015), married to Tengku Abdul Aziz Ibni Almarhum Sultan Sulaiman Badrul Alam Shah of Terengganu
 Tuanku Abdul Halim (28 November 1927 - 11 September 2017) - Sultan of Kedah from 1958 to 2017 and twice Yang di-Pertuan Agong from 1970 to 1975 and from 2011 to 2016
 Tunku Abdul Malik (24 September 1929 - 29 November 2015), Raja Muda from 1960 to 2015
 Tunku Sakinah (born 11 November 1931), married (div.) to Yves Borotra, son of the French tennis champion cum businessman, Jean Borotra. 
 Tunku Mansur (29 December 1933 - 18 August 1934)
Sultan Badlishah's second marriage in 1934 was to Tengku Asma binti Almarhum Sultan Badrul Alam Shah (1911-1994), a Terengganu princess of the Bendahara dynasty. She served as Sultanah of Kedah and gave birth to a number of children:
 Tunku Hosna (born 25 January 1935)
 Tunku Annuar (30 June 1937 - 21 May 2014)
 Tuanku Sallehuddin (born 30 April 1942) - Sultan of Kedah from September 2017 onwards, Raja Muda from 2015 to 2017
 Tunku Bisharah (born 18 October 1944)
 Tunku Kamaliah (born 6 June 1947) 
 Tunku Badriatul Jamal (born 1 September 1949)
 Tunku Abdul Hamid Thani (born 18 June 1952) - father of Tengku Jonaris Badlishah
 Tunku Nafisah (born 20 June 1954)

Death and succession
Sultan Badlishah died on 13 July 1958 and was succeeded by his son, Sultan Abdul Halim Mu'adzam Shah.

Honours

Honours of Kedah 
 Founding Grand Master of the State of Kedah Star of Valour (BKK) (30 October 1952 - 13 July 1958)
 Founding Grand Master of the Kedah Supreme Order of Merit (KOM) (30 October 1952 - 13 July 1958)
 Founding Grand Master of the State of Kedah Star of Gallantry (BPK) (30 October 1952 - 13 July 1958)

Foreign Honours 
  :
 Companion of the Order of the Crown of Thailand
 Companion of the Order of the White Elephant
  :
 Recipient of the King George V Silver Jubilee Medal (1935)
 Companion of the Order of St Michael and St George (CMG) (1936)
 Recipient of the King George VI Coronation Medal (1937)
 Knight Commander of the Order of the British Empire (KBE) - Sir (1941)
 Knight Commander of the Order of St Michael and St George (KCMG) - Sir (1948)  
 Recipient of the Queen Elizabeth II Coronation Medal (1953)

External links
 Web archive
 List of Sultans of Kedah

1894 births
1958 deaths
Badlishah
Malaysian people of Malay descent
Malaysian Muslims
Badlishah

Knights Commander of the Order of St Michael and St George
Knights Commander of the Order of the British Empire